Thoma Kikis is an American film producer, designer and entrepreneur best known for founding KannaLife Sciences. He was also a founder of Ovie Entertainment.

His work as a feature film producer began with Darkon (2006), the award-winning feature-length documentary film that follows the real-life adventures of a group of fantasy live-action role-playing (LARP) gamers which won the Best Documentary Audience Award at the 2006 South By Southwest (SXSW) Film Festival. His next film, the award-winning Alps (2011), was the fourth feature of Greek born Oscar nominated director Yorgos Lanthimos, which won the Osella Award for Best Screenplay (Yorgos Lanthimos and Efthimis Filippou) at the 68th Venice International Film Festival. Most recently was the art-house black comedy film It's A Disaster (2012) written and directed by Todd Berger and stars Julia Stiles, David Cross, Rachel Boston, Jeff Grace and America Ferrera.

In 2014, he was a guest on Bloomberg TV's Taking Stock with Pimm Fox discussing forming KannaLife, cannabinoid research and regulating the growing Medical cannabis industry in the United States. He was also featured in Sports Illustrated article on founding KannaLife and using cannabinoids to treat CTE.

Selected filmography 
Darkon (2006) (producer, executive producer;)
The Funeral Party (2007) (co-producer)
Alps (2011) (co-producer)
It's A Disaster (2012) (executive producer)

References

External links

 KannaLife Sciences Website 
 Official Website

American film producers
Year of birth missing (living people)
Living people